British Japanese or British-Japanese may be:
Britons in Japan
Japanese community in the United Kingdom
As an adjective, anything concerning Japan–United Kingdom relations
Eurasian (mixed ancestry) people of British and Japanese descent